Veščica is a settlement on the banks of the Ščavnica River in the Municipality of Razkrižje in eastern Slovenia, next to the border with Croatia. The area traditionally belonged to Zala County in the Kingdom of Hungary and is now included in the Mura Statistical Region.

References

External links
Veščica on Geopedia

Populated places in the Municipality of Razkrižje